Laheküla may refer to several places in Estonia:

Laheküla, Hiiu County, village in Hiiumaa Parish, Hiiu County
Laheküla, Lääne-Saare Parish, village in Lääne-Saare Parish, Saare County
Laheküla, Laimjala Parish, village in Saaremaa, Saare County
Laheküla, Muhu Parish, village in Muhu Parish, Saare County
Laheküla, Orissaare Parish, village in Orissaare Parish, Saare County
Laheküla, Pihtla Parish, village in Pihtla Parish, Saare County